Desire is a 1982 Filipino-American film directed by Eddie Romero and starring John Saxon, Judith Chapman, and Tetchie Agbayani.

Cast
 Tetchie Agbayani as Bessie
 Butz Aquino
 Manny Castañeda
 Judith Chapman as Julie Seaver
 Ken Metcalfe as Phil Seaver
 Maria Richwine as Cris Arias
 Ruben Rustia
 John Saxon as Joe Hale
 Charito Solis

External links

1982 films
1980s Tagalog-language films
1980s English-language films
Filipino-language films
Films about Filipino Americans
Films directed by Eddie Romero
1982 drama films
1982 multilingual films
Philippine multilingual films